Chris Hampton is an American football coach who currently serves as the co-defensive coordinator at the University of Oregon. He previously was the defensive coordinator at Tulane.

College years 
Hampton was a safety for South Carolina from 2004 to 2007 where he started for two seasons. He won the Harold White Award for the highest GPA on the team.

Coaching career 
Hampton began his coaching career in 2008 as a graduate assistant at Arkansas State. In 2011 he became the defensive backs coach at Central Arkansas before taking the same job the following year at McNeese State. In 2016 he was hired by Louisiana Monroe as the defensive backs coach leaving for the same job at Tulane before coaching a game. In 2020 he was hired by Duke to be their defensive backs coach. In 2021 he returned to Tulane as the defensive coordinator with head coach Willie Fritz stating that he was the only coach considered. In 2023 Hampton was hired as the co-defensive coordinator for Oregon.

References

External links 

 Tulane profile

Living people
Oregon Ducks football coaches
Tulane Green Wave football coaches
Duke Blue Devils football coaches
Coaches of American football from Tennessee
South Carolina Gamecocks football players
Year of birth missing (living people)